Ximending (sometimes Hsimenting, ; Tâi-lô: Se-mn̂g-ting;) is a neighborhood and shopping district in the Wanhua District of Taipei, Taiwan, along with its main rival, the Eastern District of Taipei.

Overview
Ximending has been called the "Harajuku of Taipei" and the "Shibuya of Taipei". Ximending is the source of Taiwan's fashion, subculture, and Japanese culture. Ximending has a host of clubs and pubs in the surrounding area. This area is in the northeastern part of Wanhua District in Taipei and it is also the most important consumer district in the Western District of Taipei. The well-known Ximending Pedestrian Area was the first pedestrian area built in Taipei and is the largest in Taiwan.

Access
Because many bus lines gather on Zhonghua Road, Ximending is also an important area for bus transfers. Ximending is also accessible via exit 6 of the Taipei Metro Ximen Station (Bannan Line and Songshan-Xindian Line).

History

Name
The Ximending Pedestrian Area is named after the administrative division , which existed during Japanese rule, referring to an area outside the west gate of the city. The area of Seimon-chō included modern-day Chengdu Road, Xining South Road, Kunming Street, and Kangding Road. However, today the Ximending Pedestrian Area not only includes Seimon-chō but also Wakatake-chō and Shinki-chō. The historical spelling of this area was Hsimenting, which is based on the Wade–Giles romanization of Standard Chinese. The use of the character  is unusual in a Chinese context: it denotes a chō (a part of a ward) in the Japanese municipality system.

Origin
The name of Ximending was derived from its position outside the west gate of Taipei City. In the beginning of Japanese rule, the area was still wilderness, through which there was a road connecting the west gate to the town of Bangka (now called Wanhua). Later, the Japanese decided to follow the example of Asakusa in Tokyo to set up an entertainment and business area. The earliest entertainment facilities constructed included the Taihokuza in 1897, Eiza (now called New Wanguo Market) in 1902, and the Red House Theater in 1908.

Theater street
Ximending became a well-known theater street in Taipei in the 1930s and grew even more prosperous after the defeat of Japan. In the 1950s, every theater was full to capacity and scalpers ran wild. Gradually, more theaters opened one after another; At one point, Wuchang St Section 1 had over ten theaters. However, in the 1990s, as Taipei City developed toward the Eastern District and away from Ximending, it began to lose business. In 1999, the city government and local stores established Ximending as a pedestrian area, prohibiting the entrance of vehicles on weekends and national holidays, a move that attracted young consumers and brought back business. Today, Ximending has over twenty theaters and six thousand vendors, and is a popular area for small concerts, album launches, and street performances. It is also home to the Red Envelope Clubs set up in the 1960s.

Historic sites
Because of its history, Ximending is home to several historical sites. Built during Japanese rule, Ximending Mazu Temple is one of the important and prominent historical temple. Originally opened as a market, the Red House Theater is another prominent building from the Japanese era.

The namesake West Gate and the Walls of Taipei were torn down in 1905. Chunghwa Market used to extend to this area, but was demolished in 1992.

Popularity
Ximending attracts an average of over 3 million shoppers per month. It has been called the "Harajuku of Taipei". The local bookstores sell Japanese magazines, books, CD albums, and clothing, making it a haven for harizu, or Japanese culture adorers. Individual vendors gather in the streets as well as in the large business buildings, such as Wannien Department Store and Shizilin Square, during the day, and Wanguo Department Store and Eslite 116 later at night.

The area around the Red House Theater is considered a center of Taipei's LGBT culture, and Ximending has often featured prominently in Taiwan Pride marches/parades.

Due to its popularity, Ximending also has a higher crime rate compared to the rest of the city with reports of violent brawls and prostitution. In response, the area is also subject to more policing.

Transportation
Ximending's central location within Taipei renders it easily accessible, covering the area northwest of Taipei Metro's Ximen Station.

See also
List of shopping malls in Taipei

References

External links

 http://www.ximending.tw/

Neighbourhoods in Taipei
Culture in Taipei
Shopping districts and streets in Taiwan
Shopping in Taipei
Pedestrian malls in Taiwan